Matt Campbell (born 21 January 1987) is a former professional Australian rules footballer who played with the North Melbourne Football Club in the Australian Football League from 2006 - 2012.

He is described as being small and lightly framed but is a very fast player with excellent evasive skills.

Early life 
Campbell, of Indigenous Australian heritage with tribal ancestry that can be traced to the Arrente, grew up in Alice Springs, Northern Territory.

He began his senior football in 2005 with North Adelaide in the SANFL and played every game with the club in 2006.

Campbell was drafted by the Kangaroos and moved to Melbourne in 2006.

After being dropped from the Kangaroo's list at the end of the 2012 season, Campbell was re-recruited by North Adelaide and returned to the SANFL in 2013.

North Melbourne career
Campbell made his AFL debut for the Kangaroos in Round 1, 2007 against Collingwood. He had a poor game, with only 3 possessions, and was dropped for the following game against Port Adelaide, which would have seen him playing back in his hometown. Round 3 saw him re-selected and gather 12 possessions as well as kicking his first AFL goal. He continued his good form with 13 possessions against the Brisbane Lions, and he kicked 2 goals in Round 5 against Geelong. Despite having only 4 kicks in Round 6 against Sydney, he kicked 3 goals; his third coming late in the final quarter when the Swans had got within four points.

Return to North Adelaide
He then returned to Adelaide to play for his original club North Adelaide for a three-year stint back at the Prospect Oval and then retired at the end of the 2014 SANFL season.

References

External links

North Melbourne Football Club players
1987 births
Living people
 Australian rules footballers from the Northern Territory
 Indigenous Australian players of Australian rules football
 North Adelaide Football Club players
 Darwin Football Club players
 North Ballarat Football Club players
 Australia international rules football team players
People from Alice Springs